Methyl yellow, or C.I. 11020, is an organic compound with the formula C6H5N2C6H4N(CH3)2.  It is an azo dye derived from dimethylaniline. It is a yellow solid.  According to X-ray crystallography, the C14N3 core of the molecule is planar.

It is used as a dye for plastics and may be used as a pH indicator.  In aqueous solution at low pH, methyl yellow appears red. Between pH 2.9 and 4.0, methyl yellow undergoes a transition, to become yellow above pH 4.0.

Safety
It is a possible carcinogen. As "butter yellow", the agent had been used as a food additive in butter and margarine before its toxicity was recognized.

History 
Butter yellow was synthesized by Peter Griess in the 1860s at the Royal College of Chemistry in London. The dye was used to dye butter in Germany and other parts of the world during the latter half of the 19th century and the beginning of the 20th before being phased out in the 1930s and 40s. It was in the 1930s that research led by Riojun Kinosita showed the link between several azo dyes and cancer, linking butter yellow to liver cancer in rats after two to three months exposure. In 1939, the International Congress for Cancer Research issued a recommendation for the banning of cancer-causing food dyes (including butter yellow) from food production.

In 2014, dried tofu products (a.k.a. dougan 豆乾) from Taiwan were found to have been adulterated with methyl yellow, used as a coloring agent.

See also 
Structurally similar compounds:
 Methyl red
 Oil Yellow DE

References

Further reading

External links 
 
 
 CDC - NIOSH Pocket Guide to Chemical Hazards

PH indicators
Azo dyes
Anilines
IARC Group 2B carcinogens